Manchester Institute of Innovation Research (MIoIR)  is a research institute based in Alliance Manchester Business School at the University of Manchester, UK. MIoIR is a centre of excellence in the field of innovation studies, which includes the overlap of innovation with science management and science policy.

With over 50 full members, approximately 50 PhD researchers and a range of associated academics, MIoIR is Europe’s largest and one of the world’s leading research centres in its field. As a dedicated research centre, MIoIR is at the heart of innovation-related research in the Alliance Manchester Business School and The University of Manchester.

The Institute is housed in the Denmark Building, Denmark Road, Manchester, opposite to Whitworth Art Gallery while construction works continues to transform the Alliance Manchester Business School until Autumn 2018.

History
MIoIR incorporates the prior centres PREST (Policy Research in Engineering, Science and Technology) and CRIC (Centre for Research on Innovation and Competition).

While the formulation "Manchester Institute of Innovation Research" applies to the new centre structure established in 2007, a looser federation of the constitutive research groups was established in 2003 as the Institute of Innovation Research.

See also

 List of think tanks in the United Kingdom
 Research institute

References

Innovation in the United Kingdom
Innovation organizations
Research institutes in Manchester
Departments of the University of Manchester
Research institutes established in 2007
2007 establishments in England